Events from the year 1633 in England.

Incumbents
 Monarch – Charles I
 Secretary of State – Sir John Coke
 Lord Chancellor – Thomas Coventry, 1st Baron Coventry

Events
 13 February – Fire engines are used for the first time in England to control and extinguish a fire that breaks out at London Bridge, but not before 43 houses are destroyed. 
 May – King Charles revives medieval forest laws to raise funds from fines.
 1 August – Exeter School is founded in Devon
 6 August – William Laud becomes Archbishop of Canterbury.
 18 October – Charles I reissues the Declaration of Sports, which had originated during his father's reign, listing the sports and recreations permitted on Sundays and other holy days.
 St Paul's, Covent Garden, designed by Inigo Jones in 1631 overlooking his piazza, opens to worship, the first wholly new church built in London since the English Reformation.
 English colonists settle what will become the town of Hingham, Massachusetts.

Literature
 John Ford's play 'Tis Pity She's a Whore published.
 Earliest surviving edition of the Christopher Marlowe play The Jew of Malta published, around 40 years after its first performance.
 John Donne's collected Poems published posthumously.

Births
 23 February – Samuel Pepys, civil servant and diarist (died 1703)
 26 March (bapt.) – Mary Beale, portrait painter (died 1699)
 14 October – King James II of England (died 1701)
 11 November – George Savile, 1st Marquess of Halifax, writer and statesman (died 1695)
 3 December (bapt.) – Sir Anthony Deane, naval architect and politician (died 1721)
 Approximate date
 Thomas Armstrong, politician (executed 1684)
 Sir Edward Seymour, 4th Baronet, politician (died 1708)

Deaths 
 17 February – Frances Walsingham, noblewoman (born 1567)
 1 March – George Herbert, poet and orator (born 1593)
 5 August – George Abbot, Archbishop of Canterbury (born 1562)
 10 August – Anthony Munday, writer (born 1553)
 14 November – William Ames, philosopher (born 1576)

References

 
Years of the 17th century in England